The 1993 European Grand Prix (formally the Sega European Grand Prix) was a Formula One motor race held on 11 April 1993 at Donington Park. It was the third race of the 1993 FIA Formula One World Championship. The race was contested over 76 laps and was won by Ayrton Senna for the McLaren team, ahead of second-placed Damon Hill and third-placed Alain Prost, both driving for the Williams team.

Senna's drive to victory is regarded as one of his finest, and his first lap exploits are particularly lauded, in which he passed four drivers – Michael Schumacher, Karl Wendlinger, Damon Hill and Alain Prost – to take the lead in a single lap in damp conditions. The race was the first held under the European Grand Prix title since 1985, and to date is the only Formula One Grand Prix to have been held at the Donington Park circuit.

Report

Background
After plans to hold an Asian Grand Prix at the Nippon Autopolis in Japan failed to materialise, the first European Grand Prix for eight years was run as the third race of the 1993 season. Donington Park was awarded the race, having unsuccessfully bid to host the British Grand Prix. Video game company Sega sponsored the race and the logo could be seen throughout the Grand Prix and on the podium. Sega also had naming rights to the Grand Prix.

Ivan Capelli had agreed to part ways with the Jordan team after failing to qualify at the previous round in Brazil. He was replaced by veteran Belgian driver Thierry Boutsen.

Race

The Williams cars were 1–2 in qualifying with Prost on pole ahead of Hill, Schumacher, Senna, Wendlinger and Michael Andretti. At the start, it was damp and Schumacher blocked Senna and both lost time and Wendlinger took third. Having dropped to fifth, Senna quickly passed Schumacher at the third corner. He then went after Wendlinger, passing him through the Craner Curves with Schumacher and Andretti trying to follow through. Schumacher went through but Andretti hit Wendlinger and both were out, meaning Andretti was still yet to complete a racing lap in his F1 career. Senna went after Hill now and took second at McLean's Corner. Now Prost was the target and the lead was taken at the penultimate corner – the Melbourne Hairpin. Going into the second lap, Senna led Prost, Hill, Rubens Barrichello (who had started 12th), Jean Alesi, Schumacher and JJ Lehto.

The track began to dry and everyone pitted for dry tyres. Lehto was fifth, having started from the pit lane, but he retired with handling problems on lap 14. Gerhard Berger took the place but he too retired with suspension problems six laps later. The rain returned and the leaders now pitted for wets. Mark Blundell was forced off by Senna whilst battling Fittipaldi at the Esses and then spun off backwards into the gravel trap whilst attempting to rejoin the track surface. Schumacher stayed out and was leading but soon spun out by lap 23 as a result of being on the wrong tyres. The track began to dry and everyone pitted once again with Senna having a problem and losing 20 seconds. Prost now led Senna, Hill, Barrichello, Derek Warwick and Johnny Herbert.

It began to rain and the two Williams stopped for wets while Senna stayed out. It was the correct decision because it began to dry again. The Williams stopped yet again for dries. Prost stalled in the pits in his stop and when he rejoined, he was a lap behind and down in fourth. Barrichello was now second but it rained and then stopped again. He went to the pits twice and by now Hill was in second, albeit a lap down. Barrichello, third, had trouble with his fuel pressure and retired, giving the place to Prost. Senna set the fastest lap on lap 57, on a lap when he drove into the pit lane but aborted the pit stop, showing that there actually was a shortcut through the pit lane. This is due to the Grand Prix configuration of Donington, which has the pit entry before the final hairpin corner onto the start/finish straight.

Senna won from Hill and Prost, having made four pit stops in the wet-dry conditions compared to Prost's seven. Herbert finished fourth for Lotus, stopping only once, while all the other finishing drivers stopped in the pits several times. Riccardo Patrese and Fabrizio Barbazza completed the top six. By the end, Senna had lapped the entire field except for Hill, who finished over a minute behind.

At the end of the race, Senna was led onto a podium and given a trophy that depicted Sega's mascot, Sonic the Hedgehog holding a trophy with the Sega logo underneath. A widely circulated image shows Senna holding the trophy. After this marketing photo op, he was given the official award, a trophy that does not depict either Sonic the Hedgehog or the Sega logo. McLaren is still in possession of the Sega trophy; for a long time, it was thought to have been lost until McLaren's official Twitter account revealed that it is in one of their storerooms. On 12 June 2020, McLaren put the trophy in a trophy case in McLaren Technology Center.

Classification

Qualifying

Race

Championship standings after the race

Drivers' Championship standings

Constructors' Championship standings

 Note: Only the top five positions are included for both sets of standings.

References

External links

AtlasF1's 'The Races we Remember' Series:The 1990s

European Grand Prix
European Grand Prix
European Grand Prix
Sega
European Grand Prix
Auto races in the United Kingdom